Li Xiancheng (born 23 August 2002) is a Chinese professional footballer who plays as a midfielder for Werder Bremen II.

Club career
Li's father, Li Taizhen, first entered him in the academy of Shanghai Lucky Star in 2011, after noticing his son's interest in football. After being unimpressed by Lucky Star's training facilities, his father founded the Nantong Haimen Codion training centre, and Li enrolled. In 2018 he travelled to Germany to join local side SC Borgfeld. Having also represented Oberneuland at youth level, he joined Brinkumer in 2021.

In June 2022, following impressive performances with Brinkumer, Li joined Werder Bremen, being assigned to their reserve team. He made his debut in August of the same year.

International career
Li has represented China at various youth levels internationally.

Career statistics

Club
.

References

2002 births
Living people
Sportspeople from Nantong
Footballers from Jiangsu
Chinese footballers
China youth international footballers
Association football midfielders
Association football defenders
Regionalliga players
FC Oberneuland players
SV Werder Bremen players
SV Werder Bremen II players
Chinese expatriate footballers
Chinese expatriate sportspeople in Germany
Expatriate footballers in Germany